The Charlotte Jewish News (the CJN) is a monthly (except July) Jewish magazine headquartered in Charlotte, North Carolina.

Content, editor, and circulation 
The Charlotte Jewish News reports on local and international Jewish news, events, and Jewish holidays, rituals.  It has sections on art, sports, entertainment, health, business, finance, real estate, and Jewish travel, as well as kosher recipes.

The Editor of the CJN is Shira Firestone.  Its circulation as of December 2012 was 4,137 households.

History
The first issue of the Charlotte Jewish News was published in January 1979.  That issue was sponsored by the Charlotte Jewish Federation, the Hebrew Academy, and the Jewish Community Center, and its editor was Ann Langman.  Its co-Editor and co-founder was Rita Mond, who served as its full-time Editor for many years and subsequently as an advertising executive.  

The editors through the years are as follows:

Ownership and management
The Charlotte Jewish News is affiliated with and published by the Jewish Federation of Greater Charlotte, and operates as a 501(c)3 non-profit organization. It is overseen by a board of directors representing members of the Charlotte Jewish community.  It is a member of the Jewish Press Association, and abides by its ethics.

The Foundation of Shalom Park, a 501(c)(3) non-profit agency, owns and manages the properties and facilities for the Charlotte Jewish News.

References

External links
 
Issues of the Charlotte Jewish News from 1979-2019

Local interest magazines published in the United States
Monthly magazines published in the United States
News magazines published in the United States
Jewish magazines published in the United States
Magazines established in 1979
Magazines published in North Carolina
Mass media in Charlotte, North Carolina